The men's time trial class C1 road cycling event at the 2020 Summer Paralympics took place on 31 August 2021 at Fuji Speedway, Japan. 11 riders from 10 nations competed in this event.

The C1 classification is for cyclists with severe hemiplegic or diplegic spasticity; severe athetosis or ataxia; bilateral through knee amputation, etcetera.

Results
The event took place on 31 August 2021, at 8:41:

References

Men's road time trial C1